DJ-Kicks: C.J. Bolland is a DJ mix album mixed by C.J. Bolland. It was the first album in the DJ-Kicks series, and was released on 4 September 1995 on the Studio !K7 independent record label.

Track listing
  Patrick Pulsinger - "Construction Tool"
  Damon Wild & Tim Taylor - "Bang the Acid"
  Joey Beltram - "Drome"
  Magenta - "Memory Panic"
  Bandulu - "Presence"
  Nexus 6 - "AB-Chic"
  B.C. - "Stronghold"
  Manuel & Clive - "Recognised"
  Planetary Assault Systems - "In from the Night"
  Rotor Type - "Be Yourself"
  Clementine - "Syn Son"
  Sound Enforcer - "Re-Enforcement"
  Paramatrix - "Transverse Waves"
  Planetary Assault Systems - "Starway Ritual"
  Phrenetic System - "Wayfarer"

References

External links 
Official website
DJ-Kicks website

C. J. Bolland albums
Bolland, C. J.
1995 compilation albums